The fifth season of That '70s Show, an American television series, began September 17, 2002, and ended on May 14, 2003. It aired on Fox. The region 1 DVD was released on October 17, 2006. This season is set entirely in the year 1978. All episodes are named after songs by Led Zeppelin.

Cast

Main 
Topher Grace as Eric Forman
Mila Kunis as Jackie Burkhart
Ashton Kutcher as Michael Kelso
Danny Masterson as Steven Hyde
Laura Prepon as Donna Pinciotti
Wilmer Valderrama as Fez
Debra Jo Rupp as Kitty Forman
Kurtwood Smith as Red Forman
Don Stark as Bob Pinciotti

Special guest appearance
Tom Poston as Burt Sigurdson
Bobcat Goldthwait as Eli
Jim Gaffigan as Roy
Sam Levine as Lance Crawford
Chilli as Hot Nurse

Special guest
Jessica Simpson as Annette
Betty White as Beatrice Sigurdson
Seth Green as Mitch
Fred Williard as Charlie

Special appearance
Lisa Robin Kelly as Laurie Forman

Recurring
Mo Gaffney as Joanne
Joanna Canton as Nina
Jim Rash as Fenton

Guest
Reid Scott as Ted
Sarah Lancaster as Melanie
Jack Osbourne as Andy

Episodes

Notes

References

External links 
 
 
 That '70s Show Episode Guide at The New York Times

2002 American television seasons
2003 American television seasons
Television series set in 1978
5